Matthew William Goode (born 3 April 1978) is a British actor. Goode made his screen debut in 2002 with ABC's TV film feature Confessions of an Ugly Stepsister. His breakthrough role was in the romantic comedy Chasing Liberty (2004), for which he received a nomination at Teen Choice Awards for Choice Breakout Movie Star – Male. He then appeared in a string of supporting roles in films like Woody Allen's Match Point (2005), the German-British romantic comedy Imagine Me and You (2006), and the period drama Copying Beethoven (2006). He won praise for his performance as Charles Ryder in Julian Jarrold's adaptation of Evelyn Waugh's Brideshead Revisited (2008), and as Ozymandias in the American neo-noir superhero film Watchmen (2009), based on the comics by Alan Moore and Dave Gibbons. He then starred in romantic comedy Leap Year (2010) and Australian drama Burning Man (2011), the latter earning him a nomination for Best Actor at the Film Critics Circle of Australia Awards.

Other notable film roles include The Lookout (2007), A Single Man (2009), Cemetery Junction (2010), Stoker (2013), Belle (2013), The Imitation Game (2014) and Self/less (2015). As well as appearing in films, Goode has appeared in numerous television shows. His most notable television roles include Henry Talbot in the final season of historical drama Downton Abbey, and Finley "Finn" Polmar in the CBS legal drama The Good Wife. He also had a lead role in the critically acclaimed British mini-serial Dancing on the Edge, as music journalist Stanley Mitchell. In 2017, Goode portrayed Antony Armstrong-Jones, 1st Earl of Snowdon in the second season of the Netflix biographical drama series The Crown, for which he received a Primetime Emmy Award nomination for Outstanding Guest Actor in a Drama Series. In 2018, he starred in Sky One's fantasy-romance series, A Discovery of Witches, as Professor Matthew Clairmont. In 2022, he starred in the miniseries The Offer.

Early life
Goode was born on 3 April 1978 in Exeter, Devon. His father, Anthony, was a geologist and his mother, Jennifer, is a nurse and amateur theatre director. Goode is the youngest of five children with a brother, two half-brothers, and a half-sister, television presenter Sally Meen, from his mother's previous marriage. He grew up in the village of Clyst St. Mary, near Exeter. Goode was educated at Exeter School, an independent school in Exeter, Devon, followed by the University of Birmingham and London's Webber Douglas Academy of Dramatic Art.

Career
Goode played Peter Lynley, the brother of Inspector Lynley in the BBC production Inspector Lynley Mysteries: A Suitable Vengeance and co-starred in the TV film Confessions of an Ugly Stepsister, based on the Gregory Maguire novel of the same name and William Shakespeare's play The Tempest. In 2004, Goode made his American film debut opposite Mandy Moore in the romantic comedy Chasing Liberty.

Goode co-starred in Woody Allen's thriller Match Point, opposite Jonathan Rhys Meyers and Scarlett Johansson, Ol Parker's romantic comedy Imagine Me & You, opposite Piper Perabo and Lena Headey, the TV film My Family and Other Animals, opposite Imelda Staunton, the biographical-musical drama Copying Beethoven, opposite Ed Harris and Diane Kruger and Scott Frank's crime drama The Lookout opposite Joseph Gordon-Levitt. He had a whimsical take on Brooke Burgess in the BBC miniseries He Knew He Was Right based upon Anthony Trollope's novel of the same name.

In 2008, Goode starred as Charles Ryder in the drama film Brideshead Revisited, based on Evelyn Waugh's novel of the same name. In 2009, Goode co-starred in Zack Snyder's superhero film Watchmen as Ozymandias/Adrian Veidt, and co-starred opposite Colin Firth in the drama film A Single Man, based on Christopher Isherwood's novel of the same name. In 2010, he co-starred opposite Amy Adams in the romantic comedy Leap Year.

In 2013, Goode played the lead in the BBC Two drama Dancing on the Edge, as magazine columnist Stanley Mitchell. That same year, he co-starred opposite Mia Wasikowska and Nicole Kidman in the psychological thriller film Stoker.

Also in 2013, Goode co-starred as George Wickham opposite Matthew Rhys in the three-part BBC murder mystery miniseries Death Comes to Pemberley, based on P. D. James' novel of the same name, a sequel to Jane Austen's Pride and Prejudice. In 2014, he appeared in the historical thriller The Imitation Game as Hugh Alexander, a British Second World War cryptanalyst and chess champion.

In March 2014, Goode joined the cast of the CBS legal drama The Good Wife as Finley "Finn" Polmar, a state prosecutor. Replacing Will Gardner during the fifth season, he made his debut in the 15th episode, "Dramatics, Your Honor", in which Josh Charles's character was killed off. In May 2015, Goode left The Good Wife after the sixth season's finale.

In 2014, Goode co-starred in the ITV drama Downton Abbey during the Season 5 Christmas special "A Moorland Holiday" as Henry Talbot. He returned to Downton Abbey in October 2015 beginning in the fourth episode of the sixth season. Goode also made a brief appearance in the Downton Abbey film which was released in 2019.

After appearing in multiple films in the mid-2010s, he appeared in 2016's Allied. He began working on WGN's production of Roadside Picnic series based on the Strugatsky novel in autumn 2016, but the pilot was cancelled. That year, he presented ITV's The Wine Show with Joe Fattorini and Matthew Rhys.

In 2017, Goode began production on a television adaptation of Deborah Harkness's bestselling All Souls trilogy for Sky One in the United Kingdom. The show, titled A Discovery of Witches, takes its title from the series' first book. He plays the lead role of Professor Matthew Clairmont, an Oxford molecular biologist and vampire. The show was first broadcast in the UK on 14 September 2018, and has been renewed for two more series based on the strength of its first airing in the United Kingdom where it was consistently the network's most-watched show each week for its 8-episode run. Goode starred in the prequel to Matthew Vaughn's Kingsman series, entitled The King's Man, portraying Captain Morton / The Shepherd. Set in the 20th century, prefacing World War I, the film was released in December 2021.

Personal life
Goode is married to Sophie Dymoke. They have three children: two daughters and a son. The family live in Surrey, England.

Filmography

Film

Television

Awards

References

Interviews
 News Week interview (21 April 2006)
 Sydney Morning Herald interview (1 March 2006)
 Sunday Herald interview (1 January 2006)
 USA Today interview (8 January 2004)
 LOVEFiLM Blog Matthew Goode at the London Film Festival screening of A Single Man (Oct 2009)

External links

 

1978 births
20th-century English male actors
21st-century English male actors
Actors from Exeter
Alumni of the University of Birmingham
Alumni of the Webber Douglas Academy of Dramatic Art
English male film actors
English male television actors
English male voice actors
Living people
Male actors from Devon
People educated at Exeter School